The Sweden national beach handball team is the national beach handball team of Sweden and is controlled by the Swedish Handball Federation. Their best result in the European Championship is 2017, when Sweden finished in 5th place. The team played for the first time in the 2018 World Championships.

Results

World Championships
2018 – 4th place

European Championship

References

External links
Official website
IHF profile

Beach handball
National beach handball teams
B